Fusaea longifolia is a species of plant in the family Annonaceae. It is native to Brazil, Colombia, Ecuador, French Guiana, Guyana, Peru, Suriname and Venezuela.

Description
It is a tree or bush.  It has very short petioles.  Its oblong leaves are 25 by 8 centimeters and come to a long tapering point at their tip.  The upper surface of the leaves is hairless, while the underside has sparse hairs.  Its flowers are extra-axillary, and occur alone or in pairs.  The flowers are on long pedicels. The pedicels have 1–2 bracteoles. Its sepals are partially fused to form a 3-lobed calyx.  The outer surface of the calyx is covered in rust-colored hairs.  Its flowers have 6 purple, oval to oblong, petals in two rows of three. Its flowers have numerous stamens. The outer stamens are sterile and have a petal-like appearance.  The inner stamens are fertile and the tissue connecting the anther lobes extends to form a cap. The fruits are round, smooth with a network pattern on the surface, and have red pulp with numerous seeds.

Reproductive biology
The pollen of F. longifolia is shed as loose, permanent, tetragonal or tetrahedral tetrads that are 115 micrometers in diameter.

Habitat and distribution
It has been observed growing in forest habitats.

Uses
Aublet and Safford describe it as edible and report that it is consumed by the indigenous people of French Guiana. Extracts from the leaves have been reported to contain bioactive molecules including alpha-Cadinol and Spathulenol.

References

Annonaceae
Flora of Brazil
Flora of Colombia
Flora of Ecuador
Flora of French Guiana
Flora of Guyana
Flora of Peru
Flora of Suriname
Flora of Venezuela
Taxa named by William Edwin Safford